Anna Muhamedow (1900–1938) was the acting first secretary of the Communist Party of the Turkmen SSR immediately following Yakov Popok's resignation due to ill health on 15 April 1937. He served as the sixth first secretary of the Turkmen Communist Party.

His term lasted two days until, on 17 April, Joseph Stalin selected Yakov Chubin to succeed Popok.

In 1937, Stalin sent a telegram to Muhamedow, authorising the arrest of all Afghan citizens.

He was arrested in October 1937.

Notes

References

External links 
Rulers of Soviet Republics

1900 births
1938 deaths
Soviet politicians
People from Transcaspian Oblast
Party leaders of the Soviet Union
Communist Party of Turkmenistan politicians
Great Purge victims from Turkmenistan